Cordilura albipes is a species of fly in the family Scathophagidae. It is found in the  Palearctic .

References

External links
Images representing Cordilura albipes at BOLD

Scathophagidae
Insects described in 1819
Brachyceran flies of Europe